Mohammad Samad (born 7 May 2000) is an Indian actor, known for movies like Gattu (2012), Haraamkhor (2015), Tumbbad (2018), And Chhichhore (2019). He played the lead role of Manju Kumar in the Netflix web series Selection Day (2018).

Early life 
Mohammad Samad was born in Roorkee, Uttarakhand. His parents run a grocery shop in Roorkee. He has one elder brother and four elder sisters. He did his schooling from St. Gabriel's Academy, Roorkee.

Career 
His first breakthrough performance was in the movie Gattu where he played the titular lead role Gattu for which he won the Best Child Actor Award at the 12th New York Indian Film Festival. He has acted in films like Haraamkhor and Tumbbad. In 2018, he played the lead role in the web series Selection Day on Netflix. In the 2019 film Chhichhore, he played the role of the teenage son of the lead actors Sushant Singh Rajput and Shraddha Kapoor.

Filmography

Web series

References

External links 
 Mohammad Samad on IMDb

Living people
Indian male film actors
2000 births